Lyssa Rae Chapman (born June 10, 1987) is an American businesswoman, television personality, former bail bondswoman and bounty hunter, most noted for her role on A&E TV's Dog the Bounty Hunter, in which she, along with her father Duane "Dog" Chapman and various friends and family, track down and capture wanted fugitives.

Personal life and career
Chapman was born the ninth of twelve children of Duane "Dog" Chapman. Her mother is his third wife, Lyssa Rae Brittain (née Greene). She is known as "Baby Lyssa" to distinguish from her mother "Big Lyssa". She was raised by her father until she was 10, after which she went to live with her mother in a small Alaskan town, Anderson, and had no contact with her father for six years. She later worked with him at the family bail bonds company, Da Kine Bail Bonds. She appeared on Season 2 Episode 16 of Dog and Beth: On the Hunt.

Chapman’s first daughter, Abbie Mae Chapman, was born the day after her fifteenth birthday. It was revealed in an interview during Lyssa's second pregnancy, that Abbie's father was 24 years old at the time of conception. He was subsequently arrested for statutory rape.

On February 20, 2009, Chapman married Brahman "Bo" Galanti (born July 24, 1973) in Oahu, Hawaii. The couple have one child together, Madalynn Grace Galanti, in addition to their children by other relationships. In February 2011, Chapman filed for divorce from Galanti. On March 15, 2011, she was arrested for criminal property damage and assaulting a police officer.

Howard Books, a division of Simon & Schuster, released Chapman's autobiography, Walking on Eggshells: Discovering Strength and Courage Amid Chaos, on May 7, 2013.

On June 3, 2022, Chapman married Leiana Evensen in the Pacific Ocean in Hawaii, in a private ceremony performed by Chapman’s “Uncle David”.  Chapman and Evensen previously owned a tanning salon.

Chapman opened an online clothing line in November 2019.

References

External links
 

American television personalities
American women television personalities
Bounty hunters
LGBT people from Colorado
Living people
People from Colorado
People from Denver
1987 births